Kelso Hospital, also known as Inch Hospital, is a health facility at Inch Road in Kelso, Scotland. It is managed by NHS Borders.

History
The hospital has its origins in the Kelso Union Workhouse which was designed by John Smith (1783-1864) and opened in 1854. It was converted for hospital use, based on a design by James Pearson Alison (1862-1932), in 1911. It joined the National Health Service in 1948 and subsequently became known as "Inch Hospital".

Notes

References

Hospitals in the Scottish Borders
1854 establishments in Scotland
Hospitals established in 1854
Hospital buildings completed in 1911
NHS Scotland hospitals
NHS Borders